The Jerry Nichols Tavern  is an historic house in Reading, Massachusetts.  It is a -storey wood-frame structure, five bays wide, with a side gable roof, central chimney, and clapboard siding.  The main entrance is flanked by pilasters and topped by an entablature.  The oldest portion of the house was built in 1785 by Jeremiah Nichols, a Revolutionary War veteran, farmer, and shoemaker.  This property was where Reading's minute companies drilled prior to the American Revolutionary War, and where its powder magazine was kept.  The building was expanded 1810–13, and had by 1830 been adapted as a tavern and stage coach stop.  In 1824 it was bought by Rev. Peter Sanborn, in whose family it remained into the 1940s.

The house was listed on the National Register of Historic Places in 1984.

See also
National Register of Historic Places listings in Reading, Massachusetts
National Register of Historic Places listings in Middlesex County, Massachusetts

References

Hotel buildings on the National Register of Historic Places in  Massachusetts
Houses in Reading, Massachusetts
Taverns in Massachusetts
1785 establishments in Massachusetts
Drinking establishments on the National Register of Historic Places in Massachusetts